Moses Logan Rodgers (1835–October 22, 1900) was an African American pioneer of California, arriving in 1849—the beginning of the California Gold Rush. California was annexed by the United States and was admitted to the Union as the thirty-first state on September 9, 1850.

Biography

Moses Rodgers, who was born into slavery in Missouri, came to California in 1849. He became prominent during the Gold Rush as a successful mining engineer, making a lucrative career excavating gold in mines he owned in Hornitos in Mariposa County. He was regarded as intelligent, and his professional opinion was important. He quickly became known as an expert in the state, and investors went to him for advice regarding mining claims. He became so expert at it that in post-Civil War he was appointed superintendent of several mines (Mount Gaines Mine & Washington Mine). The stockholders of these mines seem to have been both blacks and whites. Rodgers's best known mine, for which he was a stock-holding superintendent, was the Washington Mine, which he established in 1869. It was a successful operation, which also employed Chinese workers. There were years when this mine took out over half a million dollars in gold. The Washington Mine was, in the mid-1880s, one of the area's largest, employing over 30 men. Five main shafts and over 10,000 feet of underground workings brought the gold/silver ore to the surface where it was handsorted and then sent by wagon to the mine's concentration mill. A Merced newspaper said of Rodgers that "there is no better mining man in the State."

Legacy

The Moses Rodgers House which Rodgers built in 1898 at 921 South San Joaquin Street, Stockton, California is a historical landmark which is registered at The National Register of Historic Places. He built it for his wife Sarah and their five daughters, to all of whom he gave the very best education California afforded. One daughter Vivian Rodgers graduated from the University of California, Berkeley, with the class of 1909 majoring in Science and Letters.
Moses Rodgers Virtual Academy, 302 W. Weber Avenue, Stockton, is a home-based public charter school program offered by Stockton Unified School District to students in grades K–12 throughout California's San Joaquin County.

Footnotes

References

Lapp, Rudolph M. Blacks in Gold Rush California, Yale University Press (1995) - 
Savage, W. Sherman. The Negro in the Westward Movement, The Journal of Negro History, Vol. 25, No. 4 (October 1940), pp. 531–539

External links
The Glory of the Past: Historic Homes in Stockton

1835 births
1900 deaths
African-American people
American mining engineers
African-American history of California
People of the California Gold Rush